Between 1966 and 1973, a series of reorganizations occurred of the United States Public Health Service (PHS) within the Department of Health, Education and Welfare (HEW).  The reorganization by 1968 replaced PHS's old bureau structure with two new operating agencies: the Health Services and Mental Health Administration (HSMHA) and the Consumer Protection and Environmental Health Service (CPEHS).  The goal of the reorganizations was to coordinate the previously fragmented divisions to provide a holistic approach to large, overarching problems.

However, the new agencies came to be seen as unwieldy and bureaucratic, and they would turn out to be short-lived.  CPEHS was broken up in 1970, as most of it was transferred out of PHS to form the core of the new Environmental Protection Agency.  HSMHA was broken up in 1973.  This left PHS with six operating agencies, a configuration substantially similar to the current one as of 2021.

In all, PHS had at least eight discrete reorganizations in as many years.  The quick succession of reorganizations created several operating agencies that existed for a short time, as individual components were shifted between them.  This was in contrast to the decades prior and afterwards, in which organizational changes were incremental and did not substantively change the overall organizational structure of PHS.

Organization prior to 1966 
PHS first created internal divisions in 1899, when it was still called the Marine Hospital Service.  Its only major reorganization since then had occurred in 1943, which collected its several divisions into three operating agencies: the Bureau of Medical Services (BMS), Bureau of State Services (BSS), and National Institutes of Health (NIH), plus the administrative Office of the Surgeon General (OSG).  This setup persisted unto 1966, although there were minor reorganizations of the individual divisions within the agencies.  After 1960, BSS grouped its divisions into Community Health Divisions and Environmental Health Divisions.

By 1966, predecessors of several current organizations were recognizable.  NIH was already an operating agency; the Division of Indian Health and Division of Hospitals were part of BMS; the National Communicable Disease Center, Division of Occupational Health, and National Center for Radiological Health were all part of BSS's Environmental Health Divisions; and the National Center for Health Statistics was part of OSG.  The Food and Drug Administration was part of HEW, but not yet part of PHS.

Reorganizations

Initial reorganizations 

The initial reorganizations of the operating divisions was accomplished during 1966–1968 in two waves. An initial reorganization into a five-bureau structure was accomplished in 1967.  The new bureau system was oriented around "national centers", with larger divisions simply being renamed, and smaller divisions being combined as programs within the national centers.  For example, the Division of Radiological Health became the National Center for Radiological Health, the Communicable Disease Center became the National Communicable Disease Center, and several divisions relating to environmental and occupational health were merged into the National Center for Urban and Industrial Health.

However, this system would be short-lived as a more radical reorganization was carried out in 1968.  The purpose of the 1968 reorganization was to create agencies that could coordinate the relationships between divisions with similar focus, providing a holistic rather than fragmented approach.  HSMHA in particular was created with the recognition that, with the recent creation of Medicare and Medicaid increasing financing of healthcare, increased demand was straining healthcare delivery resources. CPEHS stemmed from a belief that environmental health concerned not only a person's natural environment but also the products they consumed.

Ultimately four discrete reorganization orders would occur during this period: Reorganization Plan No. 3 of 1966; HEW reorganization order of April 1, 1968; HEW reorganization order of July 1, 1968; and HSMHA reorganization of October 31, 1968.  The collective effect of these reorganizations was to split BSS split three ways into an interim bureau structure, with each part having a different destination:

 BSS's communicable disease control and environmental health divisions became part of the Bureau of Disease Prevention and Environmental Control.  This would absorb the Food and Drug Administration (which was previously part of HEW but not PHS) and lose the National Communicable Disease Center to become the Consumer Protection and Environmental Health Service (CPEHS).
 BSS's community health and hospital construction divisions would be absorbed by the Bureau of Medical Services to form the Bureau of Health Services.  This would absorb the National Institute of Mental Health from NIH, as well as the National Communicable Disease Center to become the Health Services and Mental Health Administration (HSMHA).
 BSS's training and professional development divisions became the Bureau of Health Manpower, which was absorbed by NIH.

The rapid shifts in organizational names and structures did not go unnoticed.  One employee recalled that a common joke at the time was, "If my boss calls me while I'm gone, find out who it is."  A 1969 publication about CPEHS contained the editor's note, "Another reorganization of the Food and Drug Administration has occurred since this paper was prepared. Even though these organizational details are no longer accurate, the paper is being published..."  The resulting organizations came to be seen as large and unwieldy.

Another effect of the reorganizations was the creation of the position of Assistant Secretary for Health, a political appointee who supplanted the Surgeon General as the head of the PHS.  This was seen as undermining the chain of command of the PHS Commissioned Corps, beginning a long-term shift where Commissioned Corps officers were more responsible to the agencies they were stationed in than to the Corps itself.

By the end of 1968, PHS's operating divisions were the National Institutes of Health, HSMHA, and CPEHS, the last two of which were organized as follows:

Breakup of Consumer Protection and Environmental Health Service 

The breakup of CPEHS was largely a consequence of the formation of the Environmental Protection Agency (EPA) in 1970, as the result of a desire by the new Nixon administration to gather all federal environmental activities into a single autonomous regulatory body.  During 1970–1971, most of the CPEHS was moved out of PHS and HEW to form the core of the newly created EPA.  This was accomplished in two phases, with the HEW reorganization order of January 16, 1970 and Reorganization Plan No. 3 of 1970.

Some CPEHS components remained within PHS.  The Food and Drug Administration had already become its own operating division within the PHS earlier in 1970, causing CPEHS to be briefly renamed simply the Environmental Health Service.  On the other hand, the entire National Air Pollution Control Administration was moved to EPA.

The Environmental Control Administration's five bureaus were spit between PHS and EPA.  PHS retained the Bureau of Occupational Safety and Health, which moved into HSMHA; part of the Bureau of Radiological Health, which moved into FDA; and the Bureau of Community Environmental Management, which was later absorbed by EPA and CDC in 1973.  The Bureau of Solid Waste Management, Bureau of Water Hygiene, and the rest of the Bureau of Radiological Health were transferred to EPA in 1971.

Breakup of Health Services and Mental Health Administration 

HSMHA was unpopular with many in PHS, as they felt that it shifted the focus from PHS physicians to department bureaucrats.  In addition, National Communicable Disease Center Director David Sencer became acting HSMHA Administrator at the beginning of the Nixon Administration in 1969.  HSMHA was reportedly referred to as "HSMA-ha-ha-ha" at NCDC headquarters, and Sencer was seeking to expand NCDC's scope by absorbing other components of HSMHA.  As part of this, NCDC was renamed to Center for Disease Control in 1970.

Under the HEW reorganization order of July 1, 1973, HSMHA was abolished.  The Center for Disease Control became its own operating agency within the PHS, and the remaining functions of HSMHA were assigned to newly established Health Services Administration and Health Resources Administration, the latter of which also acquired the Bureau of Health Manpower from NIH.  Finally, under the HEW reorganization order of September 25, 1973, a new operating agency, the Alcohol, Drug Abuse, and Mental Health Administration, incorporated the National Institute of Mental Health as well as the recently created National Institute on Alcohol Abuse and Alcoholism and National Institute on Drug Abuse.

Later developments 
By the end of 1973, PHS had the following operating agencies:

 National Institutes of Health
 Food and Drug Administration
 Center for Disease Control
 Alcohol, Drug Abuse, and Mental Health Administration
 Health Resources Administration
 Health Services Administration

This overall organizational structure has not substantially changed as of 2021, although there have been a few new operating agencies and minor reorganizations, the most recent of which occurred in 1992.

In 1980, the Agency for Toxic Substances and Disease Registry was created.  The Health Resources Administration and Health Services Administration would merge in 1982 to form the Health Resources and Services Administration.

Two new PHS operating agencies were then formed by promoting divisions out of other operating agencies.  The Indian Health Service split from the Health Resources and Services Administration in 1988.  The Agency for Health Care Policy and Research split from the Office of the Assistant Secretary for Health in 1989.

In 1992, the Alcohol, Drug Abuse, and Mental Health Administration was abolished, with its three institutes and their research programs moved into NIH, and their treatment functions split off to form the new Substance Abuse and Mental Health Services Administration.

Summary table 

Key:

 PHS = Public Health Service
 NIH = National Institutes of Health
 BMS = Bureau of Medical Services
 OSG = Office of the Surgeon General
 BSS/CH = Bureau of State Services, Community Health divisions
 BSS/EH = Bureau of State Services, Environmental Health divisions

 HSMHA = Health Services and Mental Health Administration
 CPEHS = Consumer Protection and Environmental Health Service
 CPEHS/ECA = Consumer Protection and Environmental Health Service, Environmental Control Administration

 ADAMHA = Alcohol, Drug Abuse, and Mental Health Administration
 HRA = Health Resources Administration
 HSA = Health Services Administration
 CDC = Center for Disease Control
 FDA = Food and Drug Administration
 EPA = Environmental Protection Agency

References 

United States Public Health Service